King's Highway 109, or Highway 109, is a former provincial highway in Ontario. It was used on two separate, unrelated routes during the 1950s and 1960s:

 From 1953–1954: Eglinton Avenue as a Connecting Link in Scarborough from Victoria Park Avenue to Kingston Road (Toronto) (Highway 2 near Scarborough Golf Club Road.
 From 1958–1964: Highway 121 from Paudash to Monck Road near Cardiff.